Henry Caicedo (18 July 1951 – 18 January 2023) was a Colombian footballer who played as a centre-back. He played in eleven matches for the Colombia national team from 1973 to 1977.

Caicedo died from complications of a stroke on 18 January 2023, at the age of 71.

References

External links
 

1951 births
2023 deaths
Colombian footballers
Footballers from Cali
Association football central defenders
Colombia international footballers
Deportivo Cali footballers
Independiente Medellín footballers
Olympic footballers of Colombia
Footballers at the 1972 Summer Olympics